Lancs/Cheshire 3 (formerly South Lancs/Cheshire 3) was an English rugby union league. Promoted teams entered South Lancs/Cheshire 2, ranked at tier 9 of the English league system. This was the basement level for club rugby union for teams in the South Lancashire, Manchester and Cheshire areas and any team from this area wanting to begin in club rugby union had to join this league. Up until 2008–09 there was relegation with teams dropping down and coming up from South Lancs/Cheshire 4.  

The division was initially known as North-West West 3 when it was created in 1987, and had a number of different names with South Lancs/Cheshire 3 being the longest running.  The division had a break for the 2015-16 season as the RFU decided to restructure the South Lancs/Cheshire league into three zones - Merseyside (West), Cheshire (South) and Lancashire (North).  This was short-lived and the division returned to its original format for the 2016–17 season - with only Lancashire (North) remaining of the three zones.

At the end of the 2016–17 season the RFU decided to break this division up into two regional leagues known as Lancs/Cheshire 3 (North) and Lancs/Cheshire 3 (South), with teams transferred into each league depending on geographical location.  At the end of the 2018–19 season the division was cancelled.

Teams 2018–19

Teams 2017–18

North

South

Participating clubs 2016-17
Aspull
Birchfield
Christleton
Congleton
Ellesmere Port
Linley
Liverpool University
Mossley Hill
Newton-le-Willows
Old Bedians
Oxton Parkonians
Prenton
Ramsey (IoM)
Wallasey

2015-16

For the 2015-16 season this league, and South Lancs/Cheshire 3, were replaced by three county-wide leagues - Cheshire (South), Merseyside (West) and Lancashire (North). However, with the exception of Lancashire North, the county leagues were axed after just one season and the South Lancs/Cheshire leagues were restored.

Participating clubs 2014-15
 Capenhurst
 Congleton
 Ellesmere Port
 Helsby	
 Knutsford	
 Linley	 
 Liverpool University
 Oldershaw
 Oxton Parkonians
 Ramsey (IoM) (relegated from South Lancs/Cheshire 2)	 
 Wallasey (relegated from South Lancs/Cheshire 2)

Participating clubs 2013-14
Buxton (relegated from South Lancs/Cheshire 2)
Capenhurst
Congleton	
Ellesmere Port	
Helsby	
Holmes Chapel - withdrew after 3 games, 1st team now plays in NOWIRUL Leagues
Knutsford
Linley	
Liverpool University
Oldershaw (relegated from South Lancs/Cheshire 2)
Oxton Parkonians
Prenton
Trentham

Participating clubs 2012-13
Capenhurst
Congleton
Ellesmere Port
Helsby
Holmes Chapel
Knutsford
Linley
Liverpool University
Manchester Medics
Parkonians
Port Sunlight
Prenton	
Trentham

Original teams
When league rugby began in 1987 this division contained the following teams:

Agecroft
Burtonwood
Halton
Helsby
Hoylake
Mossley Hill
Old Rockferrians
Prescot
Shell Stanlow
Wigan Tech

Lancs/Cheshire 3 honours

North-West West 3 (1987–1992)

The original incarnation of South Lancs/Cheshire 3 was known as North-West West 3, and was a tier 11 league with promotion up to North-West West 2 and as the lowest ranked league in the region there was no relegation.

South Lancs/Cheshire 3 (1996–2000)

The division would be reintroduced for the 1996–97 season, this time with the name South Lancs/Cheshire 3 and at tier 12 of the league system.  Promotion would be to South Lancs/Cheshire 2 (formerly North-West West 2) while relegation would be down to the newly formed South Lancs/Cheshire 4.  From the 1998–99 season onward the league was known as EuroManx South Lancs/Cheshire 3 after its sponsor EuroManx.

South Lancs/Cheshire 3 (2000–2015)

Northern league restructuring by the RFU at the end of the 1999-2000 season saw the cancellation of North West 1, North West 2 and North West 3 (tiers 7-9).  This meant that South/Lancs Cheshire 3 became a tier 9 league.  The division would continue to be known as EuroManx South Lancs/Cheshire 1 until the 2007–08 season when EuroManx ceased operations.  At the end of 2014–15 season South Lancs/Cheshire 2 and South Lancs/Cheshire 3 were discontinued and all teams were transferred into Cheshire (South), Lancashire (North) or Merseyside (West).

South Lancs/Cheshire 3 (2016-2017)

After just one season Cheshire (South) and Merseyside (West) were discontinued and South Lancs/Cheshire 2 and South Lancs/Cheshire 3 reinstated for the 2016–17 season with all clubs transferred back into these divisions.

Lancs/Cheshire 3 (2017-2019)

A further restructure for the 2018–19 season saw South Lancs/Cheshire 3 renamed to Lancs/Cheshire 3.  At the end of the 2018–19 the division was cancelled.

Number of league titles

Ellesmere Port (2) 
Hoylake (2)
Anselmians (1)
Aspull (1)
Birchfield (1)
Crewe & Nantwich (1)
Douglas (1)
Garstang (1)
Halton (1)
Holmes Chapel (1)
Manchester Medics (1)
Manchester Wanderers (1)
Marple (1)
Moore (1)
Oldershaw (1)
Oswestry (1)
Prenton (1)
Ramsey (1)
Runcorn (1)
Ruskin Park (1)
Sale FC (1)
Southport (1)
St. Mary's Old Boys (1)
Vagabonds (1)
Wallasey (1)

Notes

See also
 Cheshire RFU
 Lancashire RFU
 English rugby union system
 Rugby union in England

References

Lancs Cheshire 3
Sports leagues established in 1987
Sports leagues disestablished in 2019